Bjørt Samuelsen (2 March 1965 in Tórshavn) is a Faroese journalist, master in food science and politician (Republic).

Political career 
She was elected for the Løgting at the 2008 Faroese general election and again in 2011. She was not elected at the 2015 elections, but kept her seat in the parliament because Høgni Hoydal was appointed minister of fisheries. Samuelsen was Ministers of Trade and Industry from 4 February until 15 September 2008. She was the first female minister of trade and industry of the Faroe Islands and as of 2019 the only one. Bjørt Samuelsen was named Speaker of the Løgting in December 2022.

Bill on same sex marriage 
On 24 September 2015 Bjørt Samuelsen along with the independent member of the Løgting Sonja Jógvansdóttir, Social Democratic member Kristianna Winther Poulsen and Progress member Hanna Jensen, submitted a same-sex marriage bill to the Parliament Secretariat. The bill entered Parliament on 17 November 2015. If approved, the law would be scheduled to go into effect on 1 July 2016. The first reading took place 24 November 2015. The second reading is expected to take place in the week that starts on 7 March 2016.

Standing Committees of the Løgting, Nordic Council and Westnordic Council 
2008–2011 member of Standing Committee on Business
2008–2011 member of Standing Committee on Justice
2011–2015 vice chairperson for the Standing Committee on Business
2011–2015 member of the Standing Committee on Welfare
2011–2015 vice member of Standing Committee on Foreign affairs
2011–2015 vice member of Nordic Council
2015–2019 member of the Committee of Foreign Affairs
2015–2019 member of West Nordic Council 
2015–2019 member of the Committee of Industry, Fisheries, Aqua- and Agriculture
2015–2019 vice member of the Committee of Finance
2015–2019 vice member of the Social - and Health Committee 
2017–2019 Chairman of the Committee of Industry, Fisheries, Aqua- and Agriculture

References 

1965 births
Living people
People from Tórshavn
Members of the Løgting
Republic (Faroe Islands) politicians
Ministers of Trade and Industry of the Faroe Islands
Women government ministers of the Faroe Islands
21st-century women politicians
Faroese journalists
Faroese women journalists